Muskaan Mihani (born 26 June 1982) is an Indian actress. She is known for her roles in Dill Mill Gayye and Jugni Chali Jalandhar.

Career 

Muskaan started her career in 2004 with Sahara One's TV show Raat Hone Ko Hai as Anuja. After she played the role of Mandeep / Mandy in Ye Meri Life Hai. In 2006, she played in Pyaar Ke Do Naam: Ek Raadha, Ek Shyaam as Mala, after she roped for parallel lead in Zee TV's show Mamta as Manisha.
In 2007, she made her Bollywood debut with Hindi film Heyy Babyy as Isha's friend.
She won the medical drama show Dill Mill Gayye, where she played the role of Dr. Sapna. She was last seen in Fear Files: Darr Ki Sacchi Tasvirein as Ritu.

Personal life 

Muskaan Mihani was born on 28 June in Ahmedabad, India. She has a younger sister Rishika Mihani, who is also a television actress. Muskaan married with Bandra-based business Tushal Sobhani on 1 September 2013. Muskaan Mihani gave birth to a baby girl, name Mannat

Acting career 

Films
2007 Heyy Babyy as Isha's friend

References

External links 

Actresses from Ahmedabad
Indian television actresses
Indian film actresses
Actresses in Hindi cinema
Indian soap opera actresses
Actresses in Hindi television
Sindhi people
Living people
21st-century Indian actresses
1982 births